Dilan Raj (born 12 December 1972) is a Sri Lankan cricket coach and former player. He was a right-handed batsman and a right-arm leg break bowler. Born in Colombo, Raj represented the Zimbabwean region of Matabeleland in two first-class matches during the 1997–98 Logan Cup. In 2000, he moved to New Zealand, where he established himself as a cricket coach. He worked for Cricket Wanganui before becoming director of cricket of Palmerston North-based Manawatū Cricket Association in 2019.

References

External links
 
 

1972 births
Living people
Matabeleland cricketers
Cricketers from Colombo
Sri Lankan cricketers
Sri Lankan cricket coaches
Expatriate sportspeople in Zimbabwe
Expatriate sportspeople in New Zealand